Lelhar is a census village in Pulwama district, Jammu & Kashmir, India.

According to the 2011 Census of India, Lelhar village has a total population of 3,799 including 1,964 males and 1,835 females and has a literacy rate of 50.12%.

The people of the Lelhar village's livelihood are based on cultivation.

References 

Villages in Pulwama district